Colomb is a surname which may refer to:

 Friedrich August Peter von Colomb (1775–1854), Prussian general
 George Thomas Colomb (1787–1874), British Army general and talented amateur artist
 Georges Colomb (1856–1945), French botanist, science populariser and pioneer of French comics
 Gregory G. Colomb (1951–2011), American professor of the English language and literature
 John Colomb (1838–1909), British naval strategist, younger brother of Philip Howard Colomb
 Joséphine Colomb (1833–1892), French children's writer, lyricist, translator
 Philip Howard Colomb (1831–1899), British royal navy vice-admiral, elder brother of John Colomb
 Tazzie Colomb (born 1966), American professional female bodybuilder and powerlifter

See also 
 Yvonne Dorsey-Colomb (born 1952), American politician from Louisiana
 Michel Colombe (c. 1430 – c. 1513), French sculptor
 Collomb (surname)
 Coulomb (disambiguation)